Herlyn-Werner-Wunderlich syndrome, also known as OHVIRA (obstructed hemivagina and ipsilateral renal anomaly) is an extremely rare syndrome characterized by a congenital birth defect of the lower abdominal and pelvic organs. It is a type of abnormality of the Müllerian ducts.

In most cases, OHVIRA presents as a double uterus with unilateral obstructed (or blind) hemivagina and ipsilateral renal agenesis. It can also affect the urethra, urethral sphincter, ureters, bladder and spleen.

Although the true incidence is unknown, it has been reported to be between 0.1% and 3%.

Symptoms
Although there are no specific symptoms for this condition, common complains include progressively increasing pelvic pain during menstruation and hematocolpos due to the buildup of blood in the body. Other symptoms may include swelling of the abdomen, nausea and vomiting during menstruation, and pelvic pain. Fertility may also be affected.

The condition often leads to an increased need for C-sections due to the smaller uteruses.

Diagnosis
The condition is often diagnosed through an MRI or ultrasound. Consulting a specialist (in this case a gynecologist) is recommended.

Treatment
Symptoms can be ameliorated with medication and surgery. In most cases, the blind hemi-vagina is opened, and the fluid drained. In adolescents particularly, vaginoscopic incision of the oblique vaginal septum is a viable option.

Pregnancies in women with OHVIRA are categorized as high-risk due to the size and shape of the uteri and cervices as well as the reduced kidney function. In addition, women with undiagnosed OHVIRA can experience genital bleeding during pregnancy and may require hospitalization. Expectant mothers are often managed with cervical sutures and C-sections to prevent fetal distress during labour.

References

Gynaecologic disorders
Uterus